Ellenberg is a village and a former municipality in the district Altmarkkreis Salzwedel, in Saxony-Anhalt, Germany. Since 1 July 2009, it has been part of the municipality Wallstawe.

Former municipalities in Saxony-Anhalt
Altmarkkreis Salzwedel